Elophila nebulosalis, the nebulous munroessa moth, is a moth in the family Crambidae. It was described by Charles H. Fernald in 1887. It is found in North America, where it has been recorded from South Carolina to Florida.

The larvae are thought to be aquatic.

References

Acentropinae
Moths described in 1887
Moths of North America
Aquatic insects